Don Carlton Lemon (born March 1, 1966) is an American television journalist most well known for being a host on CNN. Lemon anchored weekend news programs on local television stations in Alabama and Pennsylvania during his early days as a journalist. Lemon worked as a news correspondent for NBC on its programming, such as Today and NBC Nightly News. He joined CNN in 2006, also as a correspondent and later achieved prominence as the presenter of Don Lemon Tonight from 2014 to 2022. He is currently a co-host of CNN This Morning alongside Kaitlan Collins and Poppy Harlow. Lemon is also a recipient of an Edward R. Murrow Award and three regional Emmy Awards.

Early life
Lemon was born March 1, 1966, in Baton Rouge, Louisiana, the son of Katherine Marie (Bouligney) and Wilmon Lee Richardson. His father was a prominent attorney, who was part of a lawsuit successfully challenging segregation of public transportation in Baton Rouge. Lemon was born under the surname of his mother's then-husband, and discovered that Wilmon was his father when he was five. He is of mostly African-American ancestry, along with Creole; his maternal grandmother was the daughter of a black mother and a white father, who had French and Scots-Irish ancestry. He attended Baker High School, a public high school in the town of Baker in East Baton Rouge Parish. Lemon was voted class president during his senior year.

Lemon attended Louisiana State University where he was a Republican and voted for Ronald Reagan. He later graduated from Brooklyn College with a major in broadcast journalism in 1996 at the age of 30. While at Brooklyn College, he interned at WNYW. He worked for Fox affiliates in St. Louis and Chicago for several years, and was a correspondent for NBC affiliates in Philadelphia and Chicago.

Career
Early in his career, Lemon reported as a weekend news anchor for WBRC in Birmingham, Alabama and for WCAU in Philadelphia, Pennsylvania. For several years he was an anchor and investigative reporter for Fox affiliate KTVI in St. Louis, Missouri, and Fox’s Chicago affiliate. Lemon reported for NBC News's New York City operations, including working as a correspondent for both Today, and NBC Nightly News; and as an anchor on Weekend Today and programs on MSNBC. In 2003, he began working at NBC owned-and-operated station WMAQ-TV in Chicago, and was a reporter and local news co-anchor. He won three Emmys for local reporting while at WMAQ.

Lemon joined CNN in September 2006. He has been outspoken in his work at CNN, criticizing the state of cable news and questioning the network publicly. He has also voiced strong opinions on ways that the African American community can improve their lives, which has caused some controversy.

In 2014, CNN began to pilot prime time shows hosted by Lemon, including The Eleventh Hour and The Don Lemon Show. Following the disappearance of Malaysia Airlines Flight 370, Lemon began to host a special, nightly program featuring discussion and analysis of the event by aviation experts. After a realignment of CNN's schedule following the cancellation of Piers Morgan Live, this hour was replaced by the news program CNN Tonight; Lemon would later become the permanent host of the hour as CNN Tonight with Don Lemon. Lemon has also participated in CNN's New Year's Eve Live as a correspondent from a city in the Central Time Zone, most often alongside fellow CNN anchor Brooke Baldwin.

Lemon's outspoken criticism of the administration of Donald Trump and accusations of racism made him a target of the president. In January 2018, after Trump controversially referred to countries such as El Salvador, Haiti, and Honduras as "shitholes" during a meeting on immigration, Lemon opened the program with a proclamation that "The president of the United States is racist. A lot of us already knew that."

In October 2018, during a discussion with Chris Cuomo on Cuomo Prime Time amid the Jeffersontown shooting, Lemon argued that Americans shouldn't "demonize any one group or any one ethnicity", and that domestic terrorism by white supremacist Americans, "most of them radicalized to the right", were a bigger threat to the safety of the country than foreigners. He went on to ask, "there is no travel ban on [white people], they have the Muslim ban, there is no white guy ban, so what do we do about that?" Lemon's remarks were criticized by conservative figures, who felt that it was "race baiting" and contradicted his suggestion that Americans should not "demonize any one group or any one ethnicity." In response to the criticism, Lemon cited data from a report by the Government Accountability Office stating that there had been 255 fatalities between September 12, 2001 and December 31, 2016, involving domestic extremists, and that killings by far-right extremists outranked those by Islamic extremists in 10 of the 15 years tracked. In the same period, no deaths were credited to attacks by far-left extremists.

In May 2021, it was announced that Lemon, along with CNN fellow journalist Chris Cuomo, would launch a podcast named The Handoff. The audio show will center around "politics and personal" and will be teleprompter-free. On May 17, CNN Tonight with Don Lemon was retitled to simply Don Lemon Tonight; Lemon apologized for how he teased the rebranding on his show, stating that he "didn't mean to set the internet on fire"—in reference to viewers who thought that Lemon would be departing CNN.

During testimony of Jussie Smollett on December 6, 2021, he said that he was in contact with Lemon during the early part of a police investigation into an alleged hate crime attack. While testifying under oath, Smollett claimed Lemon sent a text that the Chicago Police Department had doubts about his account of what transpired. Lemon has received criticism for not mentioning his role in the case when he reported on the trial late in the evening on December 6.

In February 2022, it was announced that he would be hosting a talk show for CNN's then-forthcoming streaming service CNN+ called The Don Lemon Show. However, only two episodes managed to be released in the service's sole month of operation in April 2022, before shutting down.

On September 15, 2022, it was announced that Lemon will co-anchor a new CNN morning show with Kaitlan Collins and Poppy Harlow later in the year. On October 12, 2022, it was announced that the morning show will be named CNN This Morning.

On February 19, 2023, after Nikki Haley's presidential campaign announcement, Lemon stated that Haley "isn't in her prime" and that a woman is "considered to be in her prime in her 20s and 30s and maybe 40s." The comments went viral and received widespread negative reactions online, which alleged his comments were sexist. Lemon apologized for the comments and did not appear on CNN This Morning on February 20; he returned on February 22.

Honors and awards

In 2002, Lemon won an Edward R. Murrow Award for his coverage of the capture of the D.C. area sniper, and other awards for reports on Hurricane Katrina. In 2006, he earned three Chicago / Midwest Emmy Awards—one for a business feature about Craigslist real estate listings, "Life on Craigslist," and two for reporting on the HIV/AIDS pandemic in Africa, "Journey to Africa"—while reporting for WMAQ-TV in Chicago.

Lemon was voted as one of the 150 most influential African Americans by Ebony magazine in 2009. In 2014, The Advocate listed Lemon as one of the publication's 50 Most Influential LGBTQ People in Media.

In December 2016, Lemon was honored with a Native Son Award, named after James Baldwin's Notes of a Native Son (1955), recognizing and to "encourage the increased visibility and impact of black gay men in society". In 2017, Out named him on its Power 50 list of "the most influential LGBTQ people in the USA."

In June 2019, to mark the 50th anniversary of the Stonewall riots in Greenwich Village, New York, an event widely considered a watershed moment in the modern LGBTQ rights movement, Queerty named him one of the Pride50 "trailblazing individuals who actively ensure society remains moving towards equality, acceptance and dignity for all queer people".

Personal life
Lemon lives in an apartment in Harlem and has another home in Sag Harbor on Long Island, New York.

During an on-air interview with members of Bishop Eddie Long's congregation in September 2010, Lemon discussed being sexually molested when he was five or six by a neighbor teenage boy, and that it was not until he was thirty that he told his mother about it.

In his 2011 memoir, Transparent, Lemon publicly came out as gay—having been out in his personal life and with close colleagues—becoming "one of the few openly gay black men in broadcasting." He also discussed colorism in the black community and the sexual abuse he suffered as a child. He dedicated the book to Tyler Clementi, a college student who killed himself after his roommate outed him online. Lemon also stated that he has known about his sexuality since the age of five or six.

In October 2017, he received death threats laced with racial slurs; he filed a police report detailing the incident.

On January 31, 2018, Lemon's sister, L'Tanya "Leisa" Lemon Grimes, died at the age of 58; police concluded that her death was an accidental drowning in a pond while fishing. After being absent for approximately a week, he opened his show on February 6 by thanking everyone who wished him "prayers and words of encouragement".

Lemon met real estate agent Tim Malone in 2017, after which the two began dating. The couple announced in April 2019 that they were engaged.

Published works

See also
 Broadcast journalism
 LGBT culture in New York City
 List of LGBT people from New York City
 List of United States over-the-air television networks
 New Yorkers in journalism
 United States cable news

Notes

References

External links

 
 

1966 births
Living people
African-American journalists
African-American non-fiction writers
American male non-fiction writers
21st-century American memoirists
American people of Cameroonian descent
American people of Democratic Republic of the Congo descent
American people of Nigerian descent
Baker High School (Louisiana) alumni
Brooklyn College alumni
CNN people
American gay writers
Gay men
LGBT African Americans
American LGBT broadcasters
American LGBT journalists
Gay memoirists
LGBT people from Louisiana
Louisiana Creole people
Television anchors from Chicago
Television anchors from Philadelphia
Writers from Baton Rouge, Louisiana
21st-century African-American people
20th-century African-American people
21st-century LGBT people